Orshansky Uyezd (Оршанский уезд) was one of the subdivisions of the Mogilev Governorate of the Russian Empire. It was situated in the northern part of the governorate. Its administrative centre was Orsha.

Demographics
At the time of the Russian Empire Census of 1897, Orshansky Uyezd had a population of 187,068. Of these, 79.9% spoke Belarusian, 12.1% Yiddish, 2.6% Russian, 2.0% Latvian, 1.8% Polish, 0.8% Lithuanian, 0.3% German and 0.3% Estonian as their native language.

References

 
Uezds of Mogilev Governorate
Mogilev Governorate